Niagara Falls is a 1932 American Pre-Code comedy film directed by Fatty Arbuckle. It was the last film that Arbuckle directed.

Cast
 June MacCloy
 Marion Shilling
 Gertrude Short

See also
 Fatty Arbuckle filmography

External links

1932 films
1932 comedy films
Films directed by Roscoe Arbuckle
RKO Pictures short films
American black-and-white films
American comedy short films
1930s English-language films
1930s American films